Trimethylolpropane triglycidyl ether (TMPTGE) is an organic chemical in the glycidyl ether family. It has the formula C15H26O6 and the IUPAC name is 2-[2,2-bis(oxiran-2-ylmethoxymethyl)butoxymethyl]oxirane, and the CAS number 3454-29-3. It also has another CAS number of 30499-70-8 A key use is as a modifier for epoxy resins as a reactive diluent.

Alternative names
 Oxirane, 2,2′-[[2-ethyl-2-[(2-oxiranylmethoxy)methyl]-1,3-propanediyl]bis(oxymethylene)]bis-
 Butane, 1-(2,3-epoxypropoxy)-2,2-bis[(2,3-epoxypropoxy)methyl]-
 Oxirane, 2,2′-[[2-ethyl-2-[(oxiranylmethoxy)methyl]-1,3-propanediyl]bis(oxymethylene)]bis-
 2,2′-[[2-Ethyl-2-[(2-oxiranylmethoxy)methyl]-1,3-propanediyl]bis(oxymethylene)]bis[oxirane]
 1,1,1-Trimethylolpropane triglycidyl ether

Manufacture
Trimethylolpropane and epichlorohydrin are reacted with a Lewis acid catalyst to form a halohydrin. The next step is dehydrochlorination with sodium hydroxide. This forms the triglycidyl ether.

Uses
As the molecule has 3 oxirane functionalities, a key use is modifying and reducing the viscosity of epoxy resins. These reactive diluent modified epoxy resins may then be further formulated into CASE applications: Coatings, Adhesives, Sealants, Elastomers. The use of the diluent does effect mechanical properties and microstructure of epoxy resins. It produces epoxy coatings with high impact resistance
Polymer systems with shape memory may also be produced with this particular molecule.  Fluoropolymers have also been produced with the material via a  photoinitiated mechanism. Production of biocompatible materials is also possible.

See also
 Epoxide
 Glycidol

References

Further reading

External websites
 Hexion Poly-functional Modifiers 
 Denacol epoxy diluent range
 Cargill Reactive diluents

Reactive diluents
Glycidyl ethers